This is a list of all personnel changes that occurred during the 2015 National Basketball Association (NBA) off-season and 2015–16 NBA season.

Retirements

Front office movements

Head coach changes
Off-season

Season

General manager changes
Off-season

Season

Player movements

Trades

Free agency

Free agency negotiation started on July 1, 2015, with players being able to sign starting July 9, after the July moratorium ended. The following players, who last played for an NBA team during the 2014–15 season, were scheduled to become free agents. All players became unrestricted free agents unless indicated otherwise. A restricted free agent's team has the right to keep the player by matching an offer sheet the player signs with another team.

* Player option
** Team option
*** Early termination option

Going to other American leagues

Going overseas

Released

Waived

Training camp cuts
All players listed did not make the final roster.

Draft

2015 NBA draft
The 2015 NBA draft was held on June 25, 2015, at Barclays Center in Brooklyn, New York.

First round

Second round

Previous years' draftees

See also

Notes

References

External links
NBA Transactions at NBA.com
2015 Free Agent Tracker at NBA.com
NBA Transactions at ESPN.com

Transactions
2015-16